"Come On Get Higher" is a song co-written by Matt Nathanson and Mark Weinberg. It was recorded by Nathanson and released as the second single from his album Some Mad Hope in 2008. The song had commercial success, reaching the Billboard Hot 100 at number 59 as well as charting within the Top 10 of Billboard's Adult Contemporary and Adult Pop Songs charts. In addition, it is his only single to date to receive a platinum certification from the RIAA.

The song has been covered by many artists, including country music duo Sugarland, whose live version of the song appears on the Deluxe Edition of their album Love on the Inside.

Chart performance

Weekly charts

Year-end charts

Certifications

References

External links

2008 singles
Matt Nathanson songs
Rock ballads
2008 songs
Vanguard Records singles
Song recordings produced by Marshall Altman